Sidi Mansour is a successful 2000 album by Tunisian pan-Arab singer Saber Rebaï that contains his hit song "Sidi Mansour", a massive pan-Arab hit.

Track list
(Arabic titles in parenthesis)
Sidi Mansour (سيدي منصور) 
Awel Alb (أول قلب)
Kol El Omor (كل العمر) 
Feyn El Nass (فين الناس)
El Badil (البديل)
Erhali (إرحلي)
Eez El Habayeb (عز الحبايب) 
Yeaychek (يعيشك)

2000 albums